The Irish pop duo Jedward has released four studio albums, twenty four singles (one as a featured artist) and 28 music videos. Jedward have released four albums, Planet Jedward, Victory, Young Love and Voice of a Rebel, the first two of which went double platinum in Ireland, while the third went gold. They have released 24 singles, including "Under Pressure (Ice Ice Baby)" (a mash-up of "Under Pressure" by Queen and Vanilla Ice's track "Ice Ice Baby"), "Lipstick", the song with which they represented Ireland at Eurovision 2011, and "Waterline", with which they represented Ireland at Eurovision 2012. They have released 28 music videos, 21 of which they directed or co-directed themselves.

Studio albums

Singles

As lead artist

As featured artist

Music videos

References

Discographies of Irish artists
Discography